The 12' Dinghy was a sailing event on the Sailing at the 1928 Summer Olympics program in Amsterdam. A combination of Preliminary series and final series were scheduled. 23 sailors from 20 nations competed on twelve 12' Dinghies that were supplied by the Royal Dutch Yachting Union (Koninklijke Verbonden Nederlandsche Watersport Vereenigingen).

Race schedule

Course area and course configuration 
For the 12' Dinghy the courses were just outside the locks on the buiten Y in front of Durgerdam.

At that time the Zuiderzee had an open connection with the North Sea. The sea water was salt or at best brackish.

Weather conditions

Results 
The 1928 Olympic scoring system was used.

Boat assignments 
The dinghies sails were assigned as follows:

Final results

Daily standings

Notes 
 For this event one yacht from each country, manned by 1 amateur maximum (maximum number of substitutes 1) was allowed.
 This event was a gender independent event. However it turned out to be a man's only event.

Other information 
During the Sailing regattas at the 1928 Summer Olympics among others the following persons were competing in the various classes:

Further reading

References 

12' Dinghy
12 foot dinghy